Chimanlal Chakubhai Shah  was an Indian politician and a member of the Indian National Congress political party. He was elected to the Lok Sabha, lower house of the Parliament of India in 1952 from Gohilwad-Sorath in Saurashtra. He was a member of the Constituent Assembly of India representing Saurashtra. He was also the first Indian representative of the United Nations.

References

External links
 Official biographical sketch in Parliament of India website

1902 births
Year of death missing
India MPs 1952–1957
Members of the Constituent Assembly of India
Lok Sabha members from Gujarat
Indian National Congress politicians